The Greensburg Red Sox, based in Greensburg, Pennsylvania, were a professional minor league baseball team that played in the Western Pennsylvania League in 1907.

They were the first professional baseball team to be based in Greensburg. When the team folded after the league's only season in existence, the city would not have another professional baseball team until 1934, when the Greensburg Trojans were established as an affiliate of the St. Louis Cardinals.

Notable players include major leaguers Red Bowser, and Huck Wallace, who managed the team in 1907.

Seasons

References

Baseball teams established in 1907
Sports clubs disestablished in 1907
Defunct baseball teams in Pennsylvania
Western Pennsylvania League teams
Greensburg, Pennsylvania
1907 establishments in Pennsylvania
1907 disestablishments in Pennsylvania
Baseball teams disestablished in 1907